Watch Tower Bible and Tract Society publications have made a series of predictions about Christ's Second Coming and the advent of God's Kingdom, each of which has gone unfulfilled. Almost all the predictions for 1878, 1881, 1914, 1918 and 1925 were later reinterpreted as a confirmation of the eschatological framework of the Bible Student movement and Jehovah's Witnesses, with many of the predicted events viewed as having taken place invisibly. Further expectations were held for the arrival of Armageddon in 1975, but resulted in a later apology to members from the society's leadership.

English researcher George D. Chryssides has argued that although there have been some "unrealized expectations", changes in Watch Tower chronology are attributable more to changed chronological schemes, rather than to failed predictions. The Watch Tower Society has acknowledged errors, which it said helped "sift" the unfaithful from its ranks, but says adherents remained confident that "God's Word" had not failed.

Background

Since its formation in the 1870s, the Watch Tower Bible and Tract Society has claimed that God has chosen the organization from among the churches to fill a special role in the consummation of prophetic history. Charles Taze Russell, a prolific writer and founder of the Bible Student movement, viewed himself as a "mouthpiece" of God and later as the embodiment of the "faithful and wise servant" of the parable of Matthew 24:45-47. The Watch Tower Society is now the legal and administrative arm of Jehovah's Witnesses. Its representatives assert that they have been given insight into the true meaning of the Bible and the unique ability to discern the signs of Christ's second coming.

The group's early ideology centered on the "Divine Plan of Salvation", a biblically derived outline of humanity's history and destiny, which was believed to be open to fuller understanding in the "last days". The creed incorporated Adam's fall and the entry of sin, evil and death into the world. God was believed to be permitting the world's affairs to run their ruinous course before he implemented his plan to free humanity from evil, suffering and death by means of the sacrificial death of Jesus Christ and the later establishment of God's kingdom on earth after his Second Coming.

The kingdom would be inaugurated through two phases, one destructive, the other constructive. In the first phase, earthly institutions would be overturned in a tumultuous period known as the "Battle of Armageddon". For several decades the group believed the worldwide disintegration of the social order would take the form of a bloody struggle between the wealthy and laboring classes, resulting in terror and anarchy. This would be followed by an era of grand reconstruction, in which sickness, pain and death would be removed and righteousness would triumph.

Prior to the establishment of the kingdom, a chosen "little flock" of 144,000 anointed Christians would undergo physical transformation from physical to spiritual form to achieve immortality. Since 1925, the Society has taught that Armageddon will be a universal war waged by God, resulting in a slaughter of the unfaithful. With that doctrinal change, the focus of the movement's chiliasm changed from awaiting its collective escape from earth to waiting for the impending destruction of the present world order in the Battle of Armageddon.

To clarify its identity, the group, which came to form the Bible Student movement, formulated a body of historical doctrine, including a mythical self-history, which provided a comprehensive symbolic linkage with the past but also fortified the movement's expectations for the future.

1878: End of the harvest

In 1876, Russell adopted the belief promulgated by some Adventist preachers that Jesus' parousia, or presence, had begun in 1874 and that the gathering of the little flock preliminary to the grand climax was already in progress. Using a form of parallel dispensations that incorporated "types" and "antitypes"—historical situations that prefigured corresponding situations later in time—he calculated the harvest would extend only to 1878, at which time the gathered saints would be translated into spirit form. The year would also bring the beginning of the "exercise of power" of God's kingdom, with evidence that God's favor was returning to the Jews.

The failure of Russell's prediction did not significantly alter the movement's short-term, date-focused orientation. In early 1881 Russell asserted that 1878 had, indeed, been a milestone year, marking the point at which "the nominal Christian churches were cast off from God's favor".

1881: A revised end of the harvest

By 1881, Russell had found a biblical basis for extending the harvest to a new date, later that year. He explained:

Russell wrote that "the light upon our pathway still shines and is more and more glorious" and that since 1878 the light had glowed stronger. The timing of their translation to heaven seemed nearer, he wrote: "We know not the day or hour, but expect it during 1881, possibly near the autumn where the parallels show the favor to Zion complete and due to end, the door to the marriage to shut, and the high calling to be the bride of Christ, to cease."

The second failure in 1881 precipitated a more serious crisis in the Bible Student ranks and for several years Russell's followers waited for the belated translation to occur. Russell's chronological timetable had already identified 1914 as the ultimate end of the "time of trouble", and this preserved the commitment of followers who might have been discouraged by their failed expectations for 1881. Yet many members found it inconceivable that their earthly departure might be delayed that long.

Russell consoled members with the news that 1881 had still marked the time when "death became a blessing" in the sense that any saint who died would henceforth be instantaneously changed into a spirit being. The revised view provided comfort for early believers who had held the view that the living faithful would never experience a physical death, and yet had seen other members in fact dying while they awaited their upward call. After 1881, physical death was defined as one of the ways in which some of the saints might undergo their translation.

1914: The end of human rulership

Russell's Studies in the Scriptures series had explicitly identified October 1914 as the "full end of the times of the Gentiles" and consequently the "farthest limit" of human rulership. It would bring the beginning of Christ's millennial reign and all his followers expected the immediate "translation of the saints" to rule with the revealed Christ that year. Following the earth's tribulation and unrest, the Jews would return to God's favor, the "nominal Church" would have fallen, the final battle between Christ and Satan would have ended, the kingdoms of the world would be overthrown, and Christ would have gathered his saints into heaven, where they would reign with him, and when the millennium would begin.

The belief was unequivocal, based on his study of the Bible and the Great Pyramid, and satisfied only upon the establishment of an earthly paradise. Russell remarked that altering the prophecy by even one year would destroy the perfect symmetry of its biblical chronology. In the second book of his Studies in the Scriptures series he described it as "an established truth that the final end of the kingdoms of this world, and the full establishment of the Kingdom of God, will be accomplished at the end of A.D. 1914". The result, he wrote, was that "all present governments will be overthrown and dissolved", along with the destruction of "what God calls Babylon, and what men call Christendom". In an 1894 Watch Tower, responding to readers who questioned whether—because of recent political upheavals—the world could last until 1914, he wrote:

As 1914 approached, excitement mounted over the expected "change" of anointed Christians. Early that year some Bible Students, convinced the end of the world had arrived, began distributing their material belongings, abandoning their jobs and eagerly anticipating the future. In May 1914—five months from the expected end—Russell warned followers against succumbing to doubt:

However, by September, Russell was preparing Watch Tower readers for the possibility that "Armageddon may begin next spring, yet it is purely speculation to attempt to say just when." Yet the evidence, he wrote, still pointed "to the year just before us—particularly the early months".

When again nothing took place, predictions regressed to their earlier short-term orientation. The Watch Tower wrote: "It may be that many of the Lord's people were expecting more than they should have looked for to occur with the opening of the Jewish year 1915, which began with September 21. The human mind seems to have a natural tendency, and one with which we should have sympathy, to expect matters to culminate more rapidly, fulfillments to come more suddenly, than they ever do come[...] Studying God's Word, we have measured the 2520 years, the Seven symbolic Times, from that year 606 B.C. and have found that it reached down to October, 1914, as nearly as we were able to reckon. We did not say positively that this would be the year. We merely left every one to look at the facts of history and reckon for himself."

He took that opportunity to remind readers of some cautionary pronouncements he had made several years earlier. In 1912 he had left open the possibility that, if nothing happened in October 1914, it could still happen in October 1915. He also pointed out that the period of transition could run "a good many years".

In a lengthy article of consolation, Russell wrote that it was a testing time for Christ's disciples and that some Bible Students had unreal expectations. He said it was also possible that God's Kingdom on earth would be established gradually:

Yet on October 2, 1914, he entered the staff dining room at the Watch Tower Society headquarters and declared that the Gentile times had ended and that "their kings have had their day." It signaled that God had withdrawn his benevolent disposition towards the Christian nations. The statement implied that the legitimacy of earthly governments had been downgraded in the eyes of God, which sociologist Joseph Zygmunt suggested may have contributed to the subsequent adoption of bolder tactics in condemning the global political system.

Russell viewed the outbreak of World War I as the beginning of Armageddon, which would soon descend into worldwide revolution and in 1916, shortly before his death, he reaffirmed his conviction that the end was close and the harvest of saints was ongoing:

In posthumous editions of his Studies in the Scriptures, entire sections were rewritten to accommodate the failure of the anticipated events, with 1914 now identified as " of the end of Gentile times". The outbreak of World War I was taken to be its confirmation. Sociologist James Beckford claimed that Russell's "sometimes ingenious" ex post facto rationalizations of events in 1914 contributed to the survival of the Bible Student movement. Under doctrinal changes introduced by his successor, Joseph Franklin Rutherford, it was later decided that the Millennium would come within the generation of those who saw the events of 1914. The years of 1799 and 1874, until then significant dates in Russell's millennial chronology, were also abandoned.

Yet Chryssides said there was no clear failure of the predictions surrounding 1914. "Although there was clear disappointment at the non-occurrence of certain empirically observable events, a number of the events to which Russell alludes are incapable of disconfirmation. One cannot verify the beginning of Christ's sovereign rule, the cleansing of the sanctuary, and the admission to heaven of those who have experienced the 'high calling'. Even events like the ending of the Gentile times do not have obvious empirical indicators."

1918: The new terminus

Russell's final revision of his predictions was to identify 1918 as the new terminus. The shift was based on the reasoning that the period of the Jews' favor may have lasted until 73 CE (the date of the Zealots' mass suicide at Masada), rather than 70 CE. For the modern-day parallel, the adjustment meant the conclusion of the 40-year "harvest period" was moved from 1914 to the northern spring of 1918.

Rutherford claimed in 1917 that the testimony of Bible Students themselves confirmed that the harvest was not over: "Many have consecrated and given evidence of spirit-begetting since 1914, which is the best evidence that the harvest is not yet closed." If the new date was reliable, he wrote, "and the evidence is very conclusive that it is true, then we have only a few months in which to labor before the great night settles down when no man can work."

The Finished Mystery, written soon after Russell's death by two prominent Bible Students and published in 1917, made a series of bold statements about the expected demise of "false" Christianity. The spring of 1918, it said, would "bring upon Christendom a spasm of anguish greater even than that experienced in the Fall of 1914". God's day of vengeance, the book said, would "break like a furious morning storm in 1918", destroying "the churches wholesale and the church members by millions".

When 1918 also passed without any sign of fulfillment, the initial reaction was that the harvest had indeed finished and that the full complement of those destined for translation to heaven had been assembled. The further delay in the arrival of the millennium was interpreted in 1919 as a sign that the loyalty and powers of endurance of the "Kingdom class" were being tested, and that God was finding fault with some supposedly sanctified people.

In a 1922 convention address, Rutherford retrospectively defined 1918 as the time when Christ "entered the temple for the purpose of judgment". He later wrote that it was only after 1918, when the Lord came to the temple, that it could be understood that 1914 had also marked the time when the heavenly part of God's kingdom was established and when a "New Nation" was born.

From that time the Bible Student group was able to view itself as more than just an agency for completing the ranks of the 144,000 who would rule with Christ. With the "New Nation" already born, members were given a clear twofold purpose: (1) to recruit and train a "Great Company" who would be carried through Armageddon to live in the earthly kingdom and (2) to expose the machinations of the devil in trying to obstruct the kingdom's earthly establishment.

1925: Resurrection of the patriarchs

With Rutherford now the movement's chief theologian, another round of prophetic revision ensued, this time focusing on 1925. In his 1920 booklet Millions Now Living Will Never Die, Rutherford wrote that he expected the ancient patriarchs and prophets, "the faithful ones of old", to be resurrected to earthly life in 1925 as a prelude to a general physical resurrection of faithful followers of God destined for everlasting life on earth. He explained:

Rutherford's belief that the patriarchs' return would occur in 1925 was based on his calculations of the Jewish jubilee, counting forward 3500 years from 1575 BCE. As the year advanced, he wrote of the urgency of witnessing in the "few remaining months", though he also provided a caution that not all the expected events might occur. When that prediction failed, the Watch Tower Society suspended the issuing of prophecies centered on a specific date.

Chryssides concluded: "This expectation was too specific and empirical for the date to be adjusted or the expected event spiritualised. At a convention the following year, Rutherford admitted his error, claiming that the 1925 date was 'merely an expressed opinion'." Yet Rutherford did not abandon the prediction. In 1929 the Watch Tower Society bought a piece of land in San Diego, California, where a Spanish mansion was built and named Beth Sarim ("house of the Princes").

As late as 1932 Rutherford was still delivering talks about the nearness of the kingdom: he declared that the preaching work of the Witnesses was "coming to a conclusion", that Armageddon was "only a short time away" and that the end was "much less than the length of a generation". In the late 1930s Rutherford affirmed his intention that Beth Sarim should accommodate at least some of the returning "princes", and that it should stand as a monument to the organization's firm expectation, although no new date was ever assigned to the expected event. The building was sold in 1948 and the doctrine of the return of the prophets dropped in 1950.

1975: The worldwide jubilee

In 1966 the Watch Tower Society issued the first of what became a sequence of statements on the importance of a new date—1975—that raised the possibility of that year heralding the beginning of Christ's millennial reign and, along with it, doom for unbelievers.

The hope hinged on the Society's belief that Adam had been created in the northern hemisphere in the autumn of 4026 BCE. The Society suggested that the close of the first 6000 years of human history could correspond with the end of God's "rest day"—with the transition marked by the Battle of Armageddon. Yet as researcher Richard Singelenberg has pointed out, the Society's literature at no point definitively stated that Armageddon would take place in 1975. In fact, as early as 1966 Frederick Franz, then vice-president of the society, inserted a definite "uncertainty" clause:

Expectations for 1975 also built on the belief that Christ had set up his kingdom in heaven in 1914 and that "this generation [those who were at least 15 years old in 1914, according to a 1968 Awake!] would by no means pass away" before the end came. The 1967 book, Did Man Get Here By Evolution Or By Creation?, similarly stated, "We find that the time of  generation,  day, is the one that is identified in the Bible as the 'last days'. In fact, we are actually living in the  part of that time. This can be compared, not just to the last day of a week, but rather, to the last part of that day".

In a 1969 book the Society expanded on its belief in a link between the seventh millennium of human existence and the kingdom's establishment. It stated: "In order for the Lord Jesus Christ to be 'Lord of the sabbath day,' his thousand-year reign would have to be the seventh in a series of thousand-year periods or millenniums. Thus it would be a sabbatical reign." Raymond Franz, who became a member of the group's Governing Body before defecting in 1980, claimed readers were left in no doubt about what was expected in 1975, claiming: "The presentation is in no sense indefinite or ambiguous."

The prophecy galvanized the Jehovah's Witnesses movement, and proselytism increased substantially. On the eve of the predicted Millennium, in 1974, the number of publishers (Witnesses who submitted their record of preaching) rose by 13.5 percent worldwide and many Witnesses were actively preparing for the dawn of the New Order.

Yet as 1975 drew closer the degree of uncertainty expressed in Watch Tower publications increased. The chances of Armageddon occurring that year were initially described as "feasible", "apparent" or "appropriate", but from the end of 1968 it became a mere "possibility". In 1966 the Society characterised the chronological calculations as "trustworthy"; by 1968 it considered them "reasonably accurate (but admittedly not infallible)". The basis of the gradual retraction was uncertainty over the elapsed time between the dates of Adam's creation and that of Eve.

In fact, says Singelenberg, from the end of 1968 Watch Tower Society publications never again explicitly focused on 1975 in a theological context. Though articles continued to remind readers that the "end of 6000 years of human history" was imminent, they increasingly highlighted non-Society sources that forecast a gloomy future with worldwide famine, ecological collapse and oxygen deficiency. The articles, says Singelenberg, featured emotional expressions of excitement, hope and urgency, with readers told: "What a time of turmoil is ahead of us! A climax in man's history is imminent!"

Less-cautious language appeared in publications distributed only to members of the group. In a 1968 issue of the monthly bulletin Kingdom Ministry, adherents were encouraged to increase their preaching activities because time was running out rapidly: "Less than a hundred months separate us from the end of 6000 years of man's history. What can  do in that time?" Some Witnesses sold their possessions, postponed surgery or cashed in their insurance policies to prepare for Armageddon and in May 1974 the Watch Tower Society told members: "Reports are heard of brothers selling their homes and property and planning to finish out the rest of their days in this old system in the pioneer service. Certainly this is a fine way to spend the short time remaining before the wicked world's end."

Talks at congregation meetings and assemblies also disseminated the prophecy. Speakers at some conventions highlighted the phrase "Stay alive till '75" and urged the audience to maintain their meeting attendance or risk losing their lives at Armageddon. The Dutch branch overseer urged the audience at a "Divine Purpose" district convention in 1974 to "pioneer" (take part in full-time preaching) as the end approached:

Yet The Watchtowers public coverage of the same series of conventions expressed a far more cautious tone. In its summary of the convention talks, the magazine reiterated the teaching that Bible chronology showed 6000 years of human existence would be completed in the mid-1970s, then pointed out: "These publications have never said that the world's end would come then. Nevertheless, there has been considerable individual speculation on the matter." What was certain, the magazine said, was that the end would come within the generation of those who saw the beginning of world tribulations in 1914. "So we can be confident that the end is near; we do not have the slightest doubt that God will bring it about[...] we have to wait and see exactly when, in the meantime keeping busy in God's service."

Franz says a 1968 Watchtower article implied that members should be careful about taking too literally Jesus' cautionary words about forecasting the last days. The magazine warned: "This is not the time to be toying with the words of Jesus that 'concerning that day and hour  knows[...] only the Father'. To the contrary: it is a time when one should be keenly aware that the end of this system of things is rapidly coming to its violent end."

In a 1970 paper, Joseph F. Zygmunt commented on the likely outcome for Jehovah's Witnesses if this prediction, too, failed: "While return to this old strategy would seem to expose the sect once again to prophetic failure, the risks are balanced by the potent ideological reinforcement accruing from this forthright renewal of faith, which thirty-five years of diffuse watchful waiting seem to have made necessary." But he added: "The risks of another prophetic failure actually appear to be minimal. The new prophecy is being phrased in a manner that lends itself to 'confirmation' by the old device of claiming partial supernatural fulfillment." Beckford, too, expected no significant organizational disturbance resulting from the absence of observable effects that year, suggesting in 1975 that Witnesses were being "skilfully prepared for prophetic disconfirmation" to reduce the dangers of disappointment. He noted an increasing frequency of Watch Tower Society warnings about the futility of making precise predictions about events expected for the jubilee year.

His analysis of Watch Tower Society data showed annual growth of "publishers", which had averaged 2.8 percent annually between 1961 and 1966, leapt to between 10.4 and 12.4 percent from 1967 to 1975, with the number of active Witnesses through the 1970s peaking at almost 28,000 in November 1975.

The number of average annual baptisms more than doubled, from 750 to 1851, with the ratio of defections to recruitments plummeting. The percentage of "pioneers", Witnesses devoting at least 60 hours a month in preaching work, more than tripled from 2.3 percent of members to almost 8 percent in 1974 and 1975. He also found major increases in the number of "back calls", return visits to interested members of the public who purchased publications, and average hours spent in service by individuals in the same two years.

Aftermath

The passing of 1975 without obvious incident left the Watch Tower Society open to new claims of prophetic failure. Instead of maintaining the prophetic significance of that year, however, the group's leaders embarked on a lengthy period of denial and purge, blaming rank-and-file membership for misreading the organization's interpretations. The Watchtower initially explained that the reason for the failure of Armageddon's arrival was due to the time lapse between the creation of Adam and Eve. Although the Society had earlier argued that the gap was "weeks or months, not years", it now decided the time lapse could, after all, be years.

In 1976 the magazine repeated its explanation, but declared Witnesses themselves to blame for their eager expectations about 1975 because they had misread the Bible. "It was not the word of God that failed or deceived [the individual Jehovah's Witness] and brought disappointment, but[...] his own understanding was based on wrong premises." In talks at conventions four years later, leading members of the Society finally acknowledged their error in the initial formulation of the prophecy, and in the March 15, 1980 Watchtower the Society said its claims about 1975 were regretted. It assigned no different interpretation to the date and demanded that its members recognize that there never was an explicit prophecy.

Singelenberg's analysis of Jehovah's Witness preaching activity in the Netherlands in the wake of the 1975 prophetic failure showed a drop in the group's membership from mid-1976, a trend that did not reverse until 1980. An estimated 5,000 Witnesses in the Netherlands either left the movement, were expelled, or became marginal and inactive members. Singelenberg suggested many of those expelled and shunned in the late 1970s had rebelled against the group's authority structure out of "post-prophecy frustration". Post-1975 defectors were described to him and to American researcher A. J. Brose as "opportunists" who had joined the group out of fear when the end seemed imminent, yet who lacked genuine commitment.

One elder told Singelenberg: "It was good that Armageddon did not take place. It separated the wheat from the chaff." Researcher Mathew N. Schmalz suggested the leadership drew attention from the disconfirmation by requiring an even greater loyalty from members, a demand enforced with the expulsion of almost 30,000 Witnesses in 1978 alone. The insistence on doctrinal orthodoxy reached the highest levels of the organization in 1980, with many in the writing committee disfellowshipped.

In almost every country the annual growth rate of Jehovah's Witnesses fell markedly after the 1975 failure. In the US, the group's growth-rate fell from 6 percent to 2 percent. In South Korea it plummeted from 28 percent to 7 percent and the downward trend continued through to 1978. Even among the majority who remained, morale declined: in 1977 and 1978 the average "publisher" spent 140 hours a year proselytizing, compared to 196.8 hours in 1974.

In his ethnographic study of Jehovah's Witnesses, English sociologist Andrew Holden quoted the testimony of a Witness who had been in the movement from the early 1970s, but found it impossible to remain as an active member after the failure of the 1975 prediction. He said that he, like many others, had been convinced the end would come in 1975:

Armageddon to come within 20th century
Watch Tower Society literature of the 1970s and 1980s repeatedly claimed that the "end" had to be expected before the turn of the century. The 1971 book The Nations Shall Know That I Am Jehovah – How? stated: "Shortly, within our twentieth century, the 'battle in the day of Jehovah' will begin against the modern antitype of Jerusalem, Christendom." A 1980 Watchtower article described the notion that "the wicked system of this world" would last "until the turn of the century" as "highly improbable in view of world trends and the fulfillment of Bible prophecy".

A similar statement in a 1984 Watchtower article suggested that some members of the 1914 generation "could survive until the end of the century. But there are many indications that 'the end' is much closer than that!" Until its October 22, 1995 issue, Awake! similarly included the statement, "this magazine builds confidence in the Creator's promise of a peaceful and secure new world before the generation that saw the events of 1914 passes away."

In 1989, the notion that the missionary efforts of the Witnesses would culminate before the turn of the century was first reaffirmed, then abandoned. As first published, a Watchtower article of January 1 stated: "The apostle Paul was spearheading the Christian missionary activity. He was also laying a foundation for a work that would be completed in our 20th century." Nine months later a more cautiously worded statement appeared in the Watchtower: "We have ample reasons to expect that this preaching will be completed in our time. Does that mean before the turn of a new month, a new year, a new decade, a new century? No human knows". In later bound volumes of the 1989 Watchtower magazines, the text of the January 1 article was amended to state that Christian missionary work "would be completed in our day" rather than "in our 20th century".

Adherents' response to failed predictions
According to Joseph Zygmunt, the response to each of the prophetic failures by Watch Tower Society adherents followed a general pattern:
 The initial reaction by both rank and file and the movement's leaders was usually a combination of disappointment and puzzlement.
 Proselytism declined, but members maintained an attitude of watchful waiting for the predictions to materialize. The doctrinal bases for the prophecies were reexamined and conjectures offered as to why the expected events might have been "delayed".
 A fuller realization of the quandary was achieved. The group asserted that the prophecies had, in fact, been partially fulfilled, or that some event of prophetic significance—usually supernatural and hence not open to disconfirmation—had actually transpired on the nominated dates. Belief was sustained that God's plan was continuing to unfold.
 Unfulfilled portions of the failed prophecies were projected into the future by issuing re-dated predictions, in association with retrospective reinterpretation of earlier failures.
 A selective interpretation of emerging historical events as confirmation of the signs of the approaching end. A pessimistic worldview sensitized the group to perceive almost every social disturbance and natural disaster as an indicator of the impending collapse of the earthly system.

Zygmunt concluded that the group's faith in its own belief system provided a basis for the claim of fulfillment, and the selective perception of global events furnished supportive empirical evidence. "In this sense and to this extent," he wrote, "the prophecies could not 'fail'." Unfulfilled prophecies were converted into partial successes and welcomed as divinely provided lessons revealing God's purposes more fully, yet it was accepted that each of those prophecies would eventually come to pass.

Singelenberg, too, believed a subsequent reinterpretation of failed prophecies was a survival strategy of groups such as Jehovah's Witnesses. Citing Neil Wiser, he commented: "Whatever the outcome, prophecies cannot and do not fail for the committed."

The Watch Tower Society has acknowledged that some of its time calculations and expectations resulted in "serious disappointments", with consequent defections, expulsions and opposition, which it claimed was a process of "sifting" true believers. Yet of those who remained faithful it said: "They certainly did not err in believing that God would without fail do what he had promised[...] They recognized that a mistake had been made but that in no respect had God's Word failed." The errors and speculation were attributed to an eagerness to see "the end of this evil system".

Holden concluded: "Simple as it seems, what sceptics regard as failure, the Governing Body regards as a test of faith." Holden said that given the scarcity of reference in Watch Tower Society literature to past predictive failures, it was highly unlikely that those who had joined the group within the past two decades were even aware of the Society's record. He estimated that more than 60 percent of current Witnesses had joined the movement since 1975, "hence the Governing Body has no reason to discuss with them the failure of its earlier prophecies." Yet he added: "The suppression of the 1975 prophecy failure by those who were active at the time but who have nevertheless remained in membership suggests an unusual degree of complicity." He also concurred with researcher Bryan Wilson's judgment that:

See also
Unfulfilled Christian religious predictions
Predictions and claims for the Second Coming of Christ

References

Criticism of Jehovah's Witnesses